The 2019 St Helens Metropolitan Borough Council election took place on 2 May 2019 to elect members of St Helens Metropolitan Borough Council in England. This was on the same day as other local elections. With one third of the seats on the council up for election Labour lost control of four seats although Labour retained overall control of the council. The losses were Bold and Haydock to the Green Party, Newton-Le-Willows to the Liberal Democrats and Rainhill to an Independent candidate.

Election Results

Overall election result

Overall result compared with 2018.

Ward Results

Billinge and Seneley Green

Blackbrook

Bold

Earlestown

Eccleston

Haydock

Moss Bank

Newton

Parr

Rainford

Rainhill

Sutton

Thatto Heath

Town Centre

West Park

Windle

References

2019 English local elections
2019
2010s in Merseyside
May 2019 events in the United Kingdom